Penrith is a town and civil parish in the Eden District, Cumbria, England. It contains 191 listed buildings that are recorded in the National Heritage List for England. Of these, five are listed at Grade I, the highest of the three grades, 23 are at Grade II*, the middle grade, and the others are at Grade II, the lowest grade.  Most of the listed buildings are in the town of Penrith, with some in the surrounding countryside.  The majority of these buildings are houses and associated structures, and shops.  The other listed buildings include churches and structures in the churchyards, a ruined castle, bridges, public houses and hotels, a plague stone, a beacon tower, farmhouses and farm buildings, civic buildings, a school, a railway station, a clock tower, cemetery buildings, a bank, two war memorials and a war memorial gate, and a telephone kiosk.


Key

Buildings

Notes and references

Notes

Citations

Sources

Lists of listed buildings in Cumbria
Penrith, Cumbria